Sarah Lee Brown Fleming (January 10, 1876 – January 5, 1963) was an American educator, social and community activist, playwright, poet, novelist, and the first African-American teacher in the Brooklyn school system.

Her most notable published work is the novel Hope's Highway (1918) and Clouds and Sunshine (1920).

She was born in Charleston, South Carolina, and grew up in Brooklyn. Growing up, she had aspirations to become a schoolteacher but her father thought the only job viable for her was domestic work. Despite her parents’ sentiments, she went on to become the first black schoolteacher in the Brooklyn School system.

Personal life 

On November 5, 1902, she married Richard Stedman Fleming, who was also groundbreaking in his own right as the first African-American dentist in Connecticut. They had two children, Dorothy and Harold, born in 1903 and 1906 respectively.

Civic work 

Sarah Fleming had many accomplishments in her life. In her civic work, she organized the New Haven's Women’s Civic League (1929) and founded the Phillis Wheatley Home for Girls (1936), where she promoted and developed a small shelter for young black women who came to New Haven in search for work. She was cited before Congress in 1955 for her many community contributions, and that same year she also received the Sojourner Truth Scroll, an annual award sponsored by the National Association of Negro Business and Professional Women’s Club.  She was also an associate of Mary McLeod Bethune who was a prominent influence in education. She was devoted to furthering the advancement of colored girls and women. She was also a suffragist.

Artistic work 

Sarah Fleming has been most recognized for her civic work rather than her art. The songs, skits, and musicals that she wrote have not been published. Her two known works of literature are Hope’s Highway and Clouds and Sunshine. Hope’s Highway is an antislavery novel that calls for integration and educational advancement. It suggests that educated African Americans must lead the race. Fleming addresses issues of religion, class, race, and gender. Clouds and Sunshine is a collection of poetry that sheds light on Fleming’s political views. The book is divided into three parts containing different types of poems: general poems, dialect poems, and race poems. Her writings demonstrate her determination and optimism of uplifting the African-American race.

Death 

She died five days before her 87th birthday.

References

Shockley, Ann Allen. Afro-American Women Writers 1746-1933: An Anthology and Critical Guide, New Haven, Connecticut: Meridian Books, 1989. 
 Emmanuel Sampath Nelson, African American Authors, 1745-1945: Bio-bibliographical Critical Sourcebook.* Constance Baker Motley, Equal Justice Under Law: An Autobiography
 Maureen Honey (ed.), "Sarah Lee Brown Fleming (1876–", Shadowed Dreams: Women's Poetry of the Harlem Renaissance, p. 111.

 

Schoolteachers from New York (state)
American women educators
African-American women writers
American women writers
1876 births
1963 deaths
20th-century African-American writers
African-American suffragists
American suffragists